Ascoli Satriano Cathedral is a Roman Catholic cathedral in Ascoli Satriano, Apulia, Italy, dedicated to the Nativity of the Virgin Mary. Formerly the episcopal seat of the Diocese of Ascoli Satriano, it has been since 1986 a co-cathedral in the Diocese of Cerignola-Ascoli Satriano.

See also 
Catholic Church in Italy

References 

Roman Catholic cathedrals in Italy
Cathedrals in Apulia
Churches in the province of Foggia